The enzyme 5-guanidino-2-oxopentanoate decarboxylase catalyzes the chemical reaction

5-guanidino-2-oxo-pentanoate  4-guanidinobutanal + CO2

This enzyme belongs to the family of lyases, specifically the carboxy-lyases, which cleave carbon-carbon bonds.  The systematic name of this enzyme class is 5-guanidino-2-oxo-pentanoate carboxy-lyase (4-guanidinobutanal-forming). Other names in common use include alpha-ketoarginine decarboxylase, and 2-oxo-5-guanidinopentanoate carboxy-lyase. It has 2 cofactors: thiamin diphosphate,  and Divalent cation.

References

 

EC 4.1.1
Thiamine enzymes
Enzymes of unknown structure